Ruckley and Langley  is a civil parish in Shropshire, England.  It contains four listed buildings that are recorded in the National Heritage List for England.  Of these, one is listed at Grade I, the highest of the three grades, one is at Grade II*, the middle grade, and the others are at Grade II, the lowest grade.  The parish is almost entirely rural, and the listed buildings consist of a chapel, the gatehouse of a former hall, a farmhouse, and a cottage.


Key

Buildings

References

Citations

Sources

Lists of buildings and structures in Shropshire